The Edmonton Prospects are a dormant collegiate summer baseball team based in Edmonton, Alberta, Canada. They play in the Western Canadian Baseball League. The team was founded in 2005 as the Edmonton Big River Prospects but moved to the Edmonton suburb of St. Albert after only one year of use of Telus Field with the Edmonton Cracker-Cats of the Northern League. They took a leave of absence from the WMBL for the 2008 season before returning in 2009 under their current name.

Prior to the 2012 season they played out of John Fry Park on the south side of Edmonton. In 2012 the Prospects began playing out of Telus Field, which was renamed RE/MAX Field in 2017.  The Prospects played the 2021 season as a road team. In 2022, they played most of their home games at Centennial Park Field 9 in Sherwood Park, and they plan to move to the Myshak Metro Ballpark in Spruce Grove when this new park opens.

Because of construction delays on the new ballpark, the team will not play in 2023.

See also
List of baseball teams in Canada

References

External links
 

Baseball teams established in 2005
Baseball teams in Edmonton
2005 establishments in Alberta